Josef Štěpánek Netolický (c. 1460–1538/9) was a Czech fishpond builder and architect.

Netolický worked as a regent of the Rosenbergs' domain and designed a fishpond system in southern Bohemia, around the town Třeboň. The builder of this system was the other well-known regent of this domain, Jakub Krčín. Netolický was a founder of the Zlatá Stoka (Golden Canal), one of two canals for regulation of water system in the region of Třeboň. He also worked on Třeboň's walls. House in which he lived (Nr. 89) still stands on the main town square.

External links
 Short biography 

1460s births
1539 deaths
Czech architects